A smart mattress is a mattress that has sensors to monitor sleep patterns.  Products can take the form of mattress covers, mattress pads, or the entire mattress.

References

Mattresses